Jordan Russolillo (born April 3, 1984) is an American former professional soccer player

Career
He played for the Chicago Fire two games in the Major League Soccer.

Russolillo retired in December 2008 due to career ending hip surgery and signed a contract as assistant coach for Southern Connecticut State University Men's Soccer.

References

1984 births
Living people
American soccer players
Chicago Fire FC players
Southern Connecticut Fighting Owls men's soccer players
Major League Soccer players
Chicago Fire FC draft picks
Soccer players from Connecticut
Association football defenders